Stanley School-District No. 2 is a historic one-room school building located at Chain O'Lakes State Park in Green Township, Noble County, Indiana.  It was built in 1915, and is a one-story, "T"-plan, vernacular brick building. The front facade features a large central projecting gable topped by a belfry. The building operated as a school until 1954 and housed a nature center until 2013, when it was restored to a one-room school house.

It was listed on the National Register of Historic Places in 2014.

References

One-room schoolhouses in Indiana
Nature centers in Indiana
School buildings on the National Register of Historic Places in Indiana
School buildings completed in 1915
Buildings and structures in Noble County, Indiana
National Register of Historic Places in Noble County, Indiana
1915 establishments in Indiana